The Marine Way Bridge is a cable-stayed bridge in Southport, England.

The bridge was designed by Babtie (now part of Jacobs) with architect Nicol Russell Studios, and was built by Balfour Beatty to replace a cast iron bridge that closed in 1990.

It was officially opened by Prince Edward, Earl of Wessex and Sophie, Countess of Wessex on 19 July 2004.

References

External links

Bridges completed in 2004
Road bridges in England
Southport
2004 establishments in England
Cable-stayed bridges in the United Kingdom